Kanstantin Klimiankou (born 3 August 1989) is a Belarusian cyclist, who most recently for UCI Continental team .

Major results

2009
 2nd Puchar Ministra Obrony Narodowej
2010
 3rd Road race, National Road Championships
 6th Trofeo Internazionale Bastianelli
 10th Giro del Belvedere
2011
 1st Stage 4 Toscana-Terra di Ciclismo
 3rd  Road race, UEC European Under-23 Road Championships
 3rd Piccolo Giro di Lombardia
 10th Trofeo Gianfranco Bianchin
2012
 10th Overall La Tropicale Amissa Bongo
2014
 6th Coupe des Carpathes
 8th Race Horizon Park 1
2015
 7th Race Horizon Park Maidan
 9th Grand Prix of Vinnytsia
2016
 1st Stage 4 Tour de Serbie
 6th Overall Tour of Mersin
 8th Odessa Grand Prix
2017
 4th Overall Tour de Serbie
 4th Overall Tour of Bulgaria South
 10th Overall Tour of Bulgaria North
2018
 8th Horizon Park Race for Peace
2019
 5th Tour de Ribas

References

External links

1989 births
Living people
Belarusian male cyclists
Cyclists from Minsk